State Road 311 (NM 311) is a  state highway in the US state of New Mexico. NM 311's western terminus is at NM 224 south of Field, and the eastern terminus is at U.S. Route 60 (US 60) and US 84 west of Clovis.

Major intersections

See also

References

311
Transportation in Curry County, New Mexico